Roda Homi Mistry (16 October 1928 – 8 June 2004) was an Indian politician and the founder of the Roda Mistry College of Social Work and Research Center in Gachibowli, Hyderabad, India. She was a Member of Parliament, representing Andhra Pradesh in the Rajya Sabha the upper house of India's Parliament representing the Indian National Congress. 
She was earlier the Minister for Women and Child Welfare and the Minister of Tourism in the Andhra Pradesh state government. She died on 8 July 2006 in Hyderabad, India. She was Zoroastrian. Her granddaughter, Lylah M. Alphonse, is a U.S. journalist and the author of "Triumph Over Discrimination: The Life Story of Dr. Farhang Mehr."

References

1928 births
2006 deaths
20th-century Indian politicians
20th-century Indian women politicians
Indian National Congress politicians
Indian Zoroastrians
Rajya Sabha members from Andhra Pradesh
State cabinet ministers of Andhra Pradesh
Women members of the Rajya Sabha
Parsi people
Indian National Congress politicians from Andhra Pradesh